15th Medical Battalion may refer to
15th Medical Battalion (United States Army), now the 15th Brigade Support Battalion (United States)
15th Medical Battalion (German Army)